This is a list of closed and open churches within the Roman Catholic Diocese of Albany. In 2006, the Diocese started the "Called to BE Church" initiative. As of November 2015, this initiative had reduced the number of parishes to 126 through church mergers and closings in response to declining church enrollment, priest shortages, and changing demographics.

References

External links
Detailed list of decisions about closed/suppressed parishes as part of the RCDA "Called to BE Church" initiative
List of Active RCDA Parishes
List of RCDA institutional records
Roman Catholic Diocese of Albany official website